The Central Government Complex has been the headquarters of the Government of Hong Kong since 2011. Located at the Tamar site, the complex comprises the Central Government Offices, the Legislative Council Complex and the Office of the Chief Executive of Hong Kong. The complex has taken over the roles of several buildings, including the former Central Government Offices, Murray Building and the former Legislative Council Building.

History
By 2001, existing government offices at Murray Building and the former Central Government Offices were considered to be too small. Maintenance of the buildings was also increasingly costly, and the age of the buildings limited the technology used in them. The Legislative Council Building on Jackson Road was also too small to house the entire LegCo Secretariat and all members' offices.

A new government complex at Tamar was approved by the Executive Council on 30 April 2002 under the Tung Chee-hwa administration. The new complex was to be the headquarters of the government, the Legislative Council and other community facilities, including a gallery, leisure facilities, open spaces and a waterfront promenade. At the time, the construction was estimated to cost HK$6.4 billion. 

The building was delivered through a design-build contract won by the Gammon-Hip Hing joint venture. Construction was due to begin in mid-February 2008, for completion in 2011. It engaged more than 3,000 workers.

Architecture
The architect was Rocco Yim, who premised the massing on the concept of "door always open". The new government building uses neither Chinese nor European government building designs, but instead it is a mix of postmodern architecture and low-frills international design. The building initially had an open design, but has been heavily fortified after various protests.

Public realm
The complex was originally designed by Yim under the concept of "Door Always Open", symbolising the pride that Hong Kong holds in its "openness and transparency of governance". In keeping with this theme, the complex was meant to be accessible to the public and integrated with the surrounding urban context, and incorporates a range of public spaces. Tamar Park passes through the complex, leading to the waterfront promenade on Victoria Harbour.

The Civic Square in front of the complex's East Wing has been blocked off from public access with a permanent fence.

Components

The complex consists of three blocks:

Office Block

While official use came into effect on 1 August 2011, administrative staff had moved in beginning 15 January 2011.

References

External links 

 Virtual Tours: Central Government Complex Construction in Progress, Hong Kong
 Tamar Development Project

Admiralty, Hong Kong
Government buildings in Hong Kong